Orcula pseudodolium is a species of very small air-breathing land snail, a terrestrial pulmonate gastropod mollusk in the family Orculidae. This species is endemic to Austria.

References

Orcula
Endemic fauna of Austria
Gastropods described in 1912
Taxonomy articles created by Polbot